Gare de Miramas is a railway station serving the town Miramas, Bouches-du-Rhône department, southeastern France. It is situated on the Paris–Marseille railway, and on branch lines towards Martigues and Salon-de-Provence. It is served by trains between Marseille, Avignon and Arles.

References

Railway stations in Bouches-du-Rhône